Women Are Better Diplomats is a 1941 German musical comedy film directed by Georg Jacoby and starring Marika Rökk, Willy Fritsch and Aribert Wäscher. It was based on a novel by Hans Flemming. The film was the first German feature film to be made in colour, and was one of the most expensive films produced during the Third Reich. The film met with a positive public response and was among the most popular German films of the early war years.

Plot
A dancer named Marie-Luise Pally is sent on a diplomatic mission to the Frankfurt Parliament in an attempt to stop her uncle's casino in Homburg shutting down. The film is set in the German revolutions of 1848–1849.

Cast

Production
The production period for Women Are Better Diplomats was both long and expensive, as the production team encountered various difficulties during the making of the film. It took longer to produce than any other Universum Film AG (Ufa) production, with a gap of more than two years between the start of filming in July 1939 and its debut screening in October 1941. The delays prompted the cast to joke that "When the film is done, the war will be over too". These delays also increased the cost of the production.

Many of the delays in production stemmed from the fact that Women Are Better Diplomats was the first German feature film to be shot in colour. The colour process used was Agfacolor, which had recently been developed as a German alternative to Technicolor.<ref name="Cooke">Cooke, Screening War, p. 294.</ref> As filming in Agfacolor was still new, frequent improvements were made to the process during the film's production, prompting the re-shooting of scenes to enhance the reproduction of colours. Lead actress Marika Rökk recalled that "If we thought we had finished a scene, some revoltingly gifted technician would come up with an idea for improving it". Outdoor scenes were particularly problematic: one dance scene filmed in Babelsberg Park, for example, had to be re-filmed a number of times due to the grass appearing as blue or red rather than green, depending on the sun's position.

A further  was added to the production cost when Karel Štěpánek, who had originally been cast for the part of Oberleutnant Keller, fled to London after the initial conclusion of filming and performed on radio there. This led to him being blacklisted by the Propaganda Ministry, and he had to be replaced by Erich Fiedler, with the relevant scenes being re-shot.

The film was one of many musical productions that featured a partnership between director Georg Jacoby and actress Marika Rökk. They had previously worked together on Hot Blood (1936), The Beggar Student (1936), Gasparone (1937) and A Night in May (1938). Jacoby and Rökk married each other in 1940, during the production of Women Are Better Diplomats.

Release and reception
The film's premiere was on 31 October 1941. Propaganda Minister Joseph Goebbels was not pleased with the results, but the film met with a positive public response. It was the third most popular film released in Germany between 1940 and 1942, behind Die Grosse Liebe (1942) and Wunschkonzert'' (1940).

References
Citations

Bibliography

External links

1940s historical comedy films
1941 musical comedy films
German musical comedy films
Films of Nazi Germany
Films directed by Georg Jacoby
Films with screenplays by Karl Georg Külb
Films based on German novels
Films set in the 1840s
Films set in Frankfurt
German historical comedy films
German historical musical films
1940s historical musical films
1940s German-language films